Justin Francis (born 19 August 1965) is an English activist and social entrepreneur. He is the co-founder and CEO of responsibletravel.com (founded in 2001), an activist travel company, selling holidays from around the world and publishing online travel guides and responsible tourism related content.

Biography
Justin Francis was born in 1965 in Wimbledon, London, and grew up in Bathford, Somerset. He studied Geophysics at The University of Exeter after which he worked at advertising agency J. Walter Thompson for eight years. He joined The Body Shop as Social and Environmental Agenda Marketing Manager in 1997 and then went on to head up Worldwide Marketing Communications, working closely with Dame Anita Roddick.

Business start-up
Inspired by a nine-month stint camping and travelling around Africa, Francis went back to university in 1999 to study for a Masters in Tourism, Conservation and Sustainable Development at The University of Greenwich. He set up responsibletravel.com in April 2001 with the course professor, Dr. Harold Goodwin. Dame Anita Roddick was a seed investor offering funds as well as advice.

She told Francis that a business should be “judged by how it treated the weak and the poor.”
Francis aimed to take this mantra to tourism. and show that responsible tourism can be commercially successful.
Francis says: “I don’t see myself as a traditional business person. I’m an activist using business as a tool to change the world.”

He overturned conventional thinking about travel businesses by creating a business model where travel companies and travellers could talk directly, and booking declarations were made as part of an honesty-based system.

Justin was one of the initial Trustees of British Charity The Travel Foundation. He sits on the Board of travel company, Basecamp Explorer Kenya.

In 2016 The Times named Francis as one of the world's 50 best ‘people to know in travel’.

In 2018 he joined the UK Government's Council for Sustainable Business (CSB), which advises The Department for Environment, Food and Rural Affairs on how businesses can help deliver the aims of the 25 Year Environment Plan. In 2021, in the run up to COP26 he led the CSB's work on nature and biodiversity.

Activism
Described by Lucy Siegle, eco writer at The Guardian as ‘the great activist traveller’ Francis’ mission is for a more caring travel and tourism industry.

He has described the tourism industry as the “biggest freeloader in the business world” saying, in an interview with The Guardian, that “broadly speaking, tourism globally has been unmanaged and never been taken seriously by government. It’s fun, everybody’s happy, right? But really, tourism is one of the biggest and in some cases most aggressive industries on earth and it is taking governments a very long time to recognise that it needs managing.”

He has campaigned around the issue of overtourism – presenting a documentary on the issues, released in July 2018, the use of captive cetaceans in tourism, the ethics of voluntourism and many other issues associated with responsible tourism, including conservation, wildlife and human rights. He has been outspoken about the ineffective use of carbon offsetting schemes.

In 2004 he founded The Responsible Tourism Awards which responsibletravel.com ran until 2017.

In November 2016, kidney failure and an inability to travel far as a result, gave Francis the inspiration to start the ‘Trip for a Trip’ scheme which would fund day trips for disadvantaged children around the world who lack the opportunity to travel. Justin returned to full health after a successful kidney transplant.

In November 2021 at COP26 in Glasgow, Justin, Liv Garfield and DEFRA with support from Accenture launched the Nature Handbook for Business – a practical resource for working towards a nature positive world aimed at five industry sectors, including tourism.

References

1965 births
Living people
English activists
People from Wimbledon, London